This list of religion-related awards is an index to articles about notable awards related to religion given by institutions other than the churches. Awards by churches are covered by the list of ecclesiastical decorations.

See also

 Lists of awards
 List of ecclesiastical decorations
 List of awards for contributions to culture

References

 
Religion-related